La Nuova Sardegna is an Italian regional daily newspaper for the island of Sardinia.

History and profile
La Nuova Sardegna was founded in 1891 by Enrico Berlinguer, grandfather and namesake of Enrico Berlinguer, national secretary of the Italian Communist Party.   The paper has its headquarters in Sassari. La Nuova Sardegna was acquired by Gruppo Editoriale L'Espresso in 1980.

The 2008 circulation of La Nuova Sardegna was 59,819 copies. The Espresso Group reported that the circulation of the paper was 42,300 copies in 2014.

References

External links
 Official Website 

1891 establishments in Italy
GEDI Gruppo Editoriale
Italian-language newspapers
Mass media in Sassari
Newspapers established in 1891
Daily newspapers published in Italy